Marvel Comics is an American comic book company dating to 1961. This is a list of the publications it has released in its history under the "Marvel Comics" imprint. The list does not include collected editions; trade paperbacks; digital comics; free, promotional giveaways; sketchbooks; poster books or magazines, nor does it include series published by other Marvel imprints such as Epic, Icon or Star. It also does not include titles published by Marvel's pre-1961 predecessors Timely Comics and Atlas Comics.

List of Marvel Comics publications (A)
List of Marvel Comics publications (B–C)
List of Marvel Comics publications (D–E)
List of Marvel Comics publications (F–G)
List of Marvel Comics publications (H–L)
List of Marvel Comics publications (N–R)
List of Marvel Comics publications (S)
List of Marvel Comics publications (T–V)
List of Marvel Comics publications (W–Z)

M

Notes

References

External links 

Marvel Comics at the Big Comic Book DataBase

The Unofficial Handbook of Marvel Comics Creators

 M